Santiago de Andamarca is a small location in Bolivia in the Oruro Department, Sud Carangas Province. It is the seat of the Santiago de Andamarca Municipality. In 2010 the village had an estimated population of 374.

References

Populated places in Oruro Department
Populated places in the Altiplano